Anbu (also Romanized as Anbū; also known as Anbūh-e Mashāyekh) is a village in Khotbeh Sara Rural District, Kargan Rud District, Talesh County, Gilan Province, Iran. At the 2006 census, its population was 385, in 106 families.

References 

Populated places in Talesh County